Mirjan Pavlović (born 21 April 1989) is an Australian soccer player who last played for Sydney United 58. Mirijan "PAV" is currently the SAP Technical Director for NPL1 Club Blacktown City FC. He is also the owner of Football Culture, an Academy for junior footballers 3-12 old .

Career
Pavlović was born in Lika, SR Croatia and moved to Australia when he was five years old.

He played for West Sydney Berries in the New South Wales Premier League before being signed to the Newcastle Jets youth team. He made his professional debut for the Jets, in their Round 27 loss to Adelaide United. He made two more appearances for the Jets that season, in the qualification final against Central Coast and in the semi final against Wellington Phoenix.

He was released from the Jets at the end of that season and signed for NSWPL club Sydney United for their 2010 season. At Sydney United, he scored 6 goals in 16 matches, prompting a move to New Zealand-based Wellington Phoenix of the Australian A-League on a one-year youth deal, after a successful trial including matches against Boca Juniors and Wairarapa United. The latter match saw him score a hat-trick in a 5–1 victory.

On 18 November 2010, Pavlović signed a new two-year contract with the Phoenix, tying him to the club until March 2013. Pavlović's contract with the Phoenix was terminated by mutual consent on 14 November 2012.

On 28 February 2014, Pavlović signed for an I-League club Pune FC for a one-year deal.

He returned to Sydney United after the end of the season at Pune, and signed on for the remainder of the 2014 season. He signed on for the 2015 season, but left in the mid-season transfer window to move to Victoria, signing for Arthus Papas-led Oakleigh Cannons FC. He managed a goal and an assist in his second match for Oakleigh, leading them to a 2–0 win over the previously unbeaten South Melbourne FC.

Towards the end of October 2015, it was announced that Pavlović, and Oakleigh teammate Sean Rooney, would be signing for the recently relegated Marconi Stallions FC in the NSW NPL 2.

Honours
With Sydney United:
  National Premier Leagues NSW Premiership: 2013

Personal life 
Pavlović attended Patrician Brothers' College, Blacktown.

A-League career statistics

References

External links
 
Wellington Phoenix profile

1989 births
Living people
People from Lika
Croatian emigrants to Australia
Australian people of Croatian descent
Association football forwards
Australian soccer players
Croatian footballers
Newcastle Jets FC players
Sydney United 58 FC players
Wellington Phoenix FC players
Pune FC players
Oakleigh Cannons FC players
Marconi Stallions FC players
A-League Men players
I-League players
Australian expatriate soccer players
Expatriate footballers in India
Australian expatriate sportspeople in India